A friendly society (sometimes called a benefit society, mutual aid society, benevolent society, fraternal organization or ROSCA) is a mutual association for the purposes of insurance, pensions, savings or cooperative banking. It is a mutual organization or benefit society composed of a body of people who join together for a common financial or social purpose. Before modern insurance and the welfare state, friendly societies provided financial and social services to individuals, often according to their religious, political, or trade affiliations. These societies are still widespread in many parts of the developing world, where they are referred to as ROSCAs (rotating savings and credit associations), ASCAs (accumulating savings and credit associations), burial societies, chit funds, etc.

Character
Before the development of large-scale government and employer health insurance and other financial services, friendly societies played an important part in many people's lives.  Many of these societies still exist. In some countries, some of them developed into large mutually-run financial institutions, typically insurance companies, and lost any social and ceremonial aspect they may have had; in others they continue to have a role based on solidarity and democracy without an objective to make profit. The current position of the mutual benefit society in Europe is well described in a report from 2012, commissioned by the European Commission. Healthcare mutuals worldwide are coming together in Association Internationale de la Mutualité, a Brussels-based association of healthcare mutuals.

United Kingdom
Friendly societies in countries such as the United Kingdom were subject to prudential regulation to safeguard the financial interests of their members and secure the benefits promised to them, but the legislation (see for example Friendly Societies Act 1875) was separate from that applicable to insurance companies. In other countries friendly societies have no specific legal status, which means that they have to comply to the same rules and regulations as for-profit insurance companies.

In some cases, especially in America, members typically paid a regular membership fee and went to lodge meetings to take part in ceremonies. If members became sick, they would receive an allowance to help them meet their financial obligations. The society might have a doctor whom the member could consult for free. Members of the lodge would visit to provide emotional and other support (and possibly to verify that the sick member was not malingering). When a member died, the funeral would be paid for and the members of the lodge might attend in ceremonial dress. Often, there was some money left over for the next of kin.

Friendly societies might also organize social functions such as dances, and some had sports teams for members. They occasionally became involved in political issues that were of interest to their members. Others were purely financial, with little or no social side, from their foundation—this was more typical in Britain. The first mutual savings bank, founded in Scotland in 1810, was called the "Savings and Friendly Society". Credit unions and other types of organization are modern equivalents.

Friendly Society Brasses were the emblems of village friendly societies or clubs common in the west of England between the late 18th and early 20th centuries. The use of brasses as emblems was particularly prevalent in Somerset and the surrounding counties. The Museum of English Rural Life has a collection of over 900 Friendly Society Brasses aka poleheads. The design of the brasses was sometimes conventional or sometimes represented an interest of the club such as the inn in which the meetings were held.

Female friendly societies 
Female friendly societies became a common form of friendly society in England during the 19th century e.g. the York Female Friendly Society, founded in 1788 by Faith Gray and Catherine Cappe. Grey and Cappe ran schools for girls and this society was intended to assist them. Another early Female Society was the Wisbech Female Friendly Society instituted on 1 February 1796.

Registration and regulation

Australia
In Australia, friendly societies are regulated under the Life Insurance Act 1995 (C'th) and registered with APRA.

Friendly societies were first established in Australia by community groups in the 1830s and have evolved into member-focused providers of financial services, healthcare, retirement living, aged and home care services, transport, pharmacies and other fraternal services to over 800,000 members. They typically provide savings, investment and insurance products.

Republic of Ireland
In Ireland, friendly societies are registered with the Registrar of Friendly Societies under the Friendly Societies Acts 1896–2014 (the Registrar for Companies is also the Registrar for Friendly Societies, Industrial and Provident Societies and Trade Unions).

In 2014 the Friendly Societies and Industrial and Provident Societies (Miscellaneous Provisions) Act, 2014, provided for the cessation of new friendly societies; as a result no new societies may be registered.  It was felt that the form of organisation had outlived its usefulness, largely for reasons mentioned above.  When the minister's staff examined the register, it was found that only three new societies had registered in the previous nine years, as the use of the traditional friendly society types of business had become regulated elsewhere and a 'rump', which on examination are largely public-service types, remain (mainly army, customs, gardaí, and prison officers). Many of the others could expect to cease to trade if additional, or a normal regulatory environment was required (similar to companies, health and other business (loan organisations).  The 2014 Act also provided that existing societies may not establish a 'loan fund' from the commencement of the Act (July 28, 2014).

United Kingdom
Friendly societies are registered under either the Friendly Societies Act 1974 or the Friendly Societies Act 1992. There are the following types of society registered under the Friendly Societies Act 1974: 
 friendly societies
 working men's clubs
 benevolent societies
 cattle insurance societies
 specially authorised societies

The activities of these societies varies, but includes:
 running a social club
 providing discretionary benefits to members – for instance during sickness or unemployment
 running sports clubs
 managing allotments
 insuring cattle

Some friendly societies are still governed by the 1974 Act, although no new societies can be registered under that act. Friendly societies registered under the Friendly Societies Act 1992 are incorporated entities and are registered for effecting and carrying out contracts of insurance.

Similar organisations were called industrial and provident societies.  They are trading businesses or voluntary organisations. 
Recent legal developments in Great Britain include the Co-operative and Community Benefit Societies Act 2014, which has renamed these societies as co-operative or community benefit societies. Examples include co-operatives for consumers, workers, agriculture and housing, working men's clubs, Women's Institute markets, allotment societies, mutual investment companies, housing associations and some social enterprises. Many sports clubs are registered under these provisions.

Friendly societies, alongside other mutual societies, are registered with the Financial Conduct Authority. Until December 2001, the regulator was the Registrar of Friendly Societies, and from then until April 2013 the Financial Services Authority.

See also 
 Fraternal order
501(c)(4), United States tax law
List of friendly and benevolent societies

References

External links 

 The Economic History Society Conference 2004: The Distribution of Female Friendly Societies across England in the Early Nineteenth Century
 BBC Radio 4 Woman's Hour Jan 2002
 Association of Financial Mutuals
 APRA list of Friendly Societies in Australia